Nabburg is a municipality in the district of Schwandorf, in Bavaria, Germany. It is situated on the river Naab, 23 km east of Amberg.

Town division
28 districts belong to Nabburg.:

Climate
Climate in this area has mild differences between highs and lows, and there is adequate rainfall year-round.  The Köppen Climate Classification subtype for this climate is "Cfb". (Marine West Coast Climate/Oceanic climate).

Sons and daughters of the town 

 Peter Gollwitzer (born 1950), motivation psychologist, received the Max Planck Research Prize in 1990
 Wolfgang Hesl (born 1986), football goalkeeper

References

Schwandorf (district)